Impulsive! Revolutionary Jazz Reworked is a compilation of music originally released on Impulse! Records, remixed by contemporary hip hop and electronic musicians and released in 2005 on CD and LP for the same label.

Track listing

References

Tribute albums to music-related organizations
2005 remix albums
Impulse! Records remix albums
Jazz remix albums